Labor Code of Azerbaijan is the legal code governing employment practices and labor relations in Azerbaijan. The Code sets the rules for relations between employees and employers, establishes the minimum norms for the labor rights of individuals, as well as the norms ensuring the implementation of these rights. 

The Code was enacted on February 2, 1999 by Late President of Azerbaijan Heydar Aliyev and entered into force in July 1999.

Structure 
The Labor Code of Azerbaijan consists of 13 sections, 48 chapters, and 317 articles. The sections are as follows:

General norms 
Section 1 (chapters 1-2) defines general provisions, as well as main rights, duties and general legal guarantees of the parties of labor contracts in the regulation of labor relations.

Collective contracts and agreements 
Section 2 (chapters 3-6) identifies collective bargaining, collective contract and collective agreement, in addition to defining general procedures for entering into collective contracts and agreements.

Employment contracts 
Section 3 (chapters 7-12) contains basis and rules for concluding employment contracts and agreements; working conditions, job description and legal norms regulate their application; legal norms regulating the certification of employees and workplaces; basis and rules for termination of employment contract; employee benefits upon termination of an employment contract; rules for documentation procedures of concluding, amending and terminating of employment contracts.

Working hours 
Section 4 (chapters 13-14) defines working hours and work schedule, moreover sets rules for regulation of working hours and overtime.

Day off and leave rights of employees 
Section 5 (chapters 15-23) is about rest time, day off and holidays, leave rights and its provision, duration of the leave, study leave, social leave, unpaid leave; sets rules for vacation rights, payment during vacation and leave period, procedures for the regulation of vacation rights upon terminating labor relations.

Work quotas, forms and methods of compensation and compensation guarantees 
Section 6 (chapters 24-27) includes work quotas and wage rates, salary regulations, types, rules and deduction of salary, average salary and its maintenance.

Labor and performance discipline 
Section 7 (chapters 28-29) sets rules for ensuring labor and performance discipline, as well as disciplinary procedures for violation of the rules.

Mutual material liability of employer and employee (chapters 30-32) 
Section 8 (chapters 30-32) identifies the circumstances that determine the mutual responsibility between employer and employee, also financial liability procedures for the damage caused to employee/employer by the employer/employee.

Protection of labor 
Section 9 (chapters 33-36) identifies labor protection norms, rules and principles, as well as legal, organizational, technical and financial provision of labor protection; determines guarantees for the right of the employee to exercise labor protection and control over implementation of rules and regulations for labor protection.

Specifications of defining labor relations for women, employees under the age of 18 and agrarian sector 
Section 10 (chapters 37-39) is about labor rights of women and implementation of these rights; specifications of employment of those who are under 18; and regulation of labor relations of employees at agricultural enterprises.

Labor disputes 
Section 11 (chapters 40-45) regulates collective labor disputes, collective requests and their handling, right to strike in order to resolve collective labor disputes, individual labor disputes; identifies reconciliation methods of collective labor disputes and individual labor disputes.

Social insurance for employees 
Section 12 (chapter 46) sets rules for regulation of social insurance for employees.

Conclusion 
Section 13 (chapters 47-48) is about the control over the compliance with the requirements of the Code, measures to be taken in case of violation of this Code and legal regulation of the application of the Code.

Principles 
The Code is based on 4 basic principles: ensuring equal rights; protecting interests by ensuring fairness and supremacy of law; providing favorable conditions for the use of mental, physical and financial resources to meet material, spiritual, social, economic and other living requirements of the parties; establishing legal safeguards for fulfillment of obligations primarily under labor contract (Article 2).

Employment contract 
Employment contract is a written agreement reflecting the basic terms and conditions of the employment relations, as well as rights and obligations of the parties between the employer and the employee. It is possible to conclude the employment contract for an unlimited period, or for fixed-term. An employment contract can be concluded with individuals who are at least 15 years old. Those aged 15 to 18 can be a party to an employment contract only after the written consent of their parents.

According to the Code, employment contract must contain: personal details of parties; place of work; job description; duration of the contract; date of the completion of the contract and the date of actual commencement of employment of the employee; working conditions of employee – working hours, rest time, salary, overtime, duration of paid annual leave, labor protection, social and other insurance; mutual obligations of the parties; and additional conditions defined by the parties.

Employment contract can include probation period which should not exceed 3 months. 

Employment contract can be terminated according to the initiatives of the parties, expiration of the contract, the changes in the labor conditions, changes in the ownership of the enterprise and other cases defined by the parties in the contract.

Working hours 
According to the Code, working hours are divided into normal working hours, shorter working hours, overtime and part-time work. Normal working hours is determined in Article 89 as maximum 8 hours per day while not exceeding 40 hours in a week. Working week can be determined either 5-day or 6-day.

Shorter working hours are defined in the Articles 91, 92, 93 for the specific categories of employees based on their age, health, working conditions and duties.

Part-time work is agreed between the parties and conditions are determined in the contract (Article 94).

When the hours worked exceed those agreed in contract based on the employer’s order and employee’s consent, it is considered as overtime. Every worker cannot be involved in overtime work for more than 4 hours over the 2 consecutive working days, it is allowed maximum 2 hours for those working at difficult and hazardous conditions. The overtime shall be reimbursed in accordance with the Article 165.

Rest time 
During the working day/shift employees should be provided with a break for rest and lunch. The time and duration of the break is determined by the internal disciplinary rules, shift schedule or employment contract. The rest period after the end of the working day shall not be less than 12 hours (Article 103). Weekly rest periods cover 2 consecutive days in 5-day working week and one day in 6-day working week (Article 104).

Public holidays 
According to the Article 105 of the Labor Code, following public holidays are not considered as working  days in Azerbaijan:

 New Year’s Day (1 January)
 Women’s Day (8 March)
Victory Day (9 May)
Republic Day (28 May)
 Day of National Salvation (15 June)
Armed Forces Day (26 June)
State Flag Day (9 November)
International Solidarity Day of Azerbaijanis (31 December)
Novruz holiday (20-21 March)
Gurban and Ramadan holidays

Day of National Mourning 
January 20 of each year shall be a Day of Mourning and is not considered as a working day (Article 106).

Leave 
According to the Article 112 of the Labor Code, leave is categorized into followings:

 annual leave (including standard and additional vacation time)
 social leave for maternity and child care
 educational leave
 unpaid leave

Annual leave is measured in working days. A prerequisite for its use is a work experience of at least 6 months for at least 21 working days. Depending on the work experience of the employee, additional vacation time is added to the standard annual leave.

See also 

 Ministry of Labour and Social Protection of Population of Azerbaijan
 Labour rights in Azerbaijan

References

External links 
Official website of the Ministry of Labour and Social Protection of Population of Azerbaijan
Law of Azerbaijan
Right to work
Labor in Azerbaijan